Tri Klyucha is a rural locality (a village) in Michurinsky Selsoviet, Sharansky District, Bashkortostan, Russia. The population was 107 as of 2010. There are 3 streets.

Geography 
Tri Klyucha is located 29 km northeast of Sharan (the district's administrative centre) by road. Borisovka is the nearest rural locality.

References 

Rural localities in Sharansky District